WOHI (1490 AM) is a radio station broadcasting a classic hits format. Licensed to East Liverpool, Ohio, United States, it serves the Pittsburgh area.  The station is currently owned by FM Radio Licenses, LLC.

WOHI (Woah-Hi) was joined by an FM station (WOHI-FM 104.3) years after it came on the air.  Their former slogan was "Music of Your Life", with a nostalgia format.  
 
Once Keymarket purchased the stations, they moved 104.3 to Moon Township, and gave it the WOGI call sign. It is now boasting their "Froggy" country format while 1490 WOHI is still in East Liverpool, now with a "Pickle" format. Before that, Keymarket had assigned an ESPN sports format on WOHI.

External links

OHI
OHI